Tricholoma viridilutescens is a species of fungus belonging to the family Tricholomataceae.

It is native to Europe.

References

viridilutescens
Fungi of Europe
Fungi described in 1978